Arthur & George is a three-part British television drama based on the 2005 book of the same name by Julian Barnes, based in turn on the real-life Great Wyrley Outrages. The first episode aired on 2 March 2015 on ITV. It stars Martin Clunes as Arthur Conan Doyle.

Cast
Martin Clunes as Arthur Conan Doyle
Arsher Ali as George Edalji
Charles Edwards as Alfred Wood
Art Malik as Reverend Shapurji Edalji
Emma Fielding as Charlotte Edalji

Fictions

While the source book itself is not intended to be strictly historically accurate, the TV series contains additional inventions, such as the murder of a blacksmith and the death of a dog walker at the fictional Rugeley Falls. Conan Doyle's chief suspect Royden Sharp is included in the story, but his suicide is invented to provide a tidy conclusion to the drama.

Production
The production filmed sections of episodes two and three in Kent. The Chatham Historic Dockyard was used to film London street scenes, including the outside of the Metropolitan Police station, George Edalji's lodgings and the night sequence in which Sir Arthur secretly follows George Edalji. Filming also took place at Blists Hill Victorian Town at Ironbridge  and at The Black Country Museum in Dudley.

Awards
Nominee Critics Choice Television Awards 2016  Best Actor in a Movie Made for Television or Limited Series — Martin Clunes
Nominee Satellite Awards 2016  Best Actor in a Miniseries or a Motion Picture Made for Television — Martin Clunes

Ratings

References

External links
 
 Conan Doyle, Arthur. The Case of Mr George Edalji at Project Gutenberg Australia. Accessed 8 July 2015

2010s British drama television series
ITV television dramas
2015 British television series debuts
2015 British television series endings
2010s British television miniseries
Television shows based on British novels
Cultural depictions of Arthur Conan Doyle
English-language television shows